Jim or Jimmy Taylor may refer to:

Sports
 Jim Taylor (Australian footballer) (1932–2000), Australian rules footballer for South Melbourne and Norwood
 Jim Taylor (footballer, born 1893) (1893–1969), Australian rules footballer for Essendon
 Jim Taylor (footballer, born 1907) (1907–1987), Australian rules footballer for St Kilda
 Jim Taylor (footballer, born 1917) (1917–2001), English football player
 Jim Taylor (footballer, born 1934), English football player
 Jim Taylor (footballer, born 1944) (born 1944), Scottish footballer
 Jim Taylor (fullback) (1935–2018), American football player
 Jim Taylor (linebacker) (1934–2005), American football player
 Jim Taylor (tackle), American college football player
 Jim Bob Taylor (born 1959), American football quarterback
 Jimmy Taylor (basketball), South Alabama college basketball coach
 Jimmy Taylor (rugby league) (born 1984), rugby league player
 Candy Jim Taylor (1884–1948), American baseball player
 Jimmie Taylor (born 1995), American basketball player

Other
 Jim Taylor (Afghan war), witness at Omar Khadr's Guantanamo military commission
 Jim Taylor (explorer) (1901–1987), explorer born in Australia
 Jim Taylor (politician) (1920–2005), Australian politician
 Jim Taylor (writer) (born 1963), American film producer and screenwriter
 Jim B. Taylor (1860–1944), South African Randlord, i.e. manager of diamond and gold mines
 James R. Taylor (born 1928), Canadian communications professor
 Jimmy Taylor (Jericho), character on TV series
 Jim Taylor, cowboy leader involved in the Sutton–Taylor feud

See also
 James Taylor (disambiguation)
 Jamie Taylor (born 1982), footballer